The Burlington Chiefs are a Junior "A" box lacrosse team from Burlington, Ontario, Canada.  The Chiefs play in the OLA Junior A Lacrosse League.

Season-by-season results
Note: GP = Games played, W = Wins, L = Losses, T = Ties, Pts = Points, GF = Goals for, GA = Goals against

References

External links
Chiefs Webpage
The Bible of Lacrosse
Unofficial OLA Page

Ontario Lacrosse Association teams
Lacrosse teams in Ontario
Burlington, Ontario
1976 establishments in Ontario
Lacrosse clubs established in 1976